Rani Devi is a member of the Indian Women's Hockey Team.  She was named the Most Promising Young Player of the Tournament at the conclusion of the second qualifier.

External links
 Rani Devi On Fire
 The real ‘Chak De’ story

Living people
Indian female field hockey players
Year of birth missing (living people)